Salbia is a genus of moths of the family Crambidae described by Achille Guenée in 1854.

Species
Salbia abnormalis 
Salbia ancidalis (Snellen, 1875)
Salbia cassidalis Guenée, 1854
Salbia cognatalis 
Salbia deformalis 
Salbia ecphaea (Hampson, 1912)
Salbia endolasea (Hampson, 1912)
Salbia extensalis Dognin, 1911
Salbia flabellalis 
Salbia grisealis (Hampson, 1918)
Salbia haemorrhoidalis Guenée, 1854
Salbia illectalis Walker, 1859
Salbia interruptalis (Amsel, 1956)
Salbia lenalis Walker, 1859
Salbia lophoceralis 
Salbia lotanalis Druce, 1899
Salbia melanobathrum (Dyar, 1914)
Salbia melanolopha 
Salbia midalis (Schaus, 1924)
Salbia minimalis (Amsel, 1956)
Salbia mizaralis (Druce, 1899)
Salbia munroealis 
Salbia nebulosalis 
Salbia pachyceralis (Hampson, 1917)
Salbia pepitalis (Guenée, 1854)
Salbia plicata (Hampson, 1912)
Salbia sciagraphalis (Dyar, 1914)
Salbia seriopunctalis (Hampson, 1895)
Salbia subnebulosalis 
Salbia thyrsonoma 
Salbia torsalis 
Salbia tremulalis (Druce, 1899)
Salbia tytiusalis (Walker, 1859)
Salbia varanalis (Schaus, 1940)
Salbia zena (Druce, 1902)

References

Spilomelinae
Crambidae genera
Taxa named by Achille Guenée